Amastra albolabris was a species of air-breathing land snails, terrestrial pulmonate gastropod mollusks in the family Amastridae. This species was endemic to Oahu, and was known from the Waianae Range.

References

Amastra
Extinct gastropods
Taxonomy articles created by Polbot